Hargill is a census-designated place (CDP) in Hidalgo County, Texas, United States. As of the 2010 United States Census, it had a population of 877.

Hargill is part of the McAllen–Edinburg–Mission Metropolitan Statistical Area.

Geography
Hargill is located at  (26.4425672, -98.0138932).

History
The community's history dates back to the early 1900s. Two businessmen, William Apsey Harding and Samuel Lamar Gill, formed a partnership known as the Harding-Gill Company in 1916 for the purpose of developing the land. The name Hargill originated from the last names of the two men. In 1920, school was constructed in the community. A post office opened in 1924 and a railroad station was established in 1926. By 1930, Hargill had an estimated population of 400 with several stores and three churches. The number of residents grew to 450 by the late 1940s. Hargill's population declined to approximately 100 in the mid-1960s, but steadily grew during the remainder of the twentieth century. In 1990, the population exceeded 1,300 and remained at that level in 2000.

Government and infrastructure
The United States Postal Service operates the Hargill Post Office. Hargill's zip code is 78549.

Education
Public education in the community of Hargill is provided by the Edinburg Consolidated Independent School District (ECISD). Zoned campuses include Hargill Elementary School (grades PK-5; located in Hargill), Brewster K-8 for middle school (6-8), and Edinburg North High School (9-12).

South Texas Independent School District operates area magnet schools.

All of Hidalgo County is in the service area of South Texas College.

Notable person
Gloria E. Anzaldúa – Writer/poet

References

External links

Hargill Elementary School

Unincorporated communities in Hidalgo County, Texas
Unincorporated communities in Texas